Triatoma rubida is a species of kissing bug in the family Reduviidae. It is found in Central America and North America.

Subspecies
These two subspecies belong to the species Triatoma rubida:
 Triatoma rubida rubida (Uhler, 1894)
 Triatoma rubida uhleri Neiva, 1911

References

Further reading

 
 

Reduviidae
Articles created by Qbugbot
Insects described in 1894